Andrew Neil (18 November 1892 – 14 August 1941) was a Scottish professional footballer who made 75 appearances in Division One for Kilmarnock and 327 appearances in the English Football League for Brighton & Hove Albion (two spells), Arsenal and Queens Park Rangers. He played as an inside forward or wing half.

Life and career
Neil was born in Crosshouse, near Kilmarnock in Ayrshire. He joined Kilmarnock of Division One from junior club Ardeer Thistle, and made his debut on 12 April 1913 away to Motherwell. He played regularly in his second season, and in 1914–15, his 20 goals placed him sixth in the division's scoring charts.

Neil came south in 1920 to sign for Brighton & Hove Albion of the newly formed Football League Third Division. He was a regular at inside right, technically skilful and creative, and impressed to the extent that First Division club Arsenal paid a £3,000 feean Albion club recordfor his services in March 1924. He was never a regular at Arsenal, but despite a lack of pace, was brought into the team at the insistence of captain Charlie Buchan to play a roving inside-forward role in front of a purely defensive centre half; the tactical change contributed to a runners-up finish in 1925–26. Although he had played 27 matches that season, Neil returned to Brighton in March 1926. He stayed until the 1927 close season, and then moved on to another third-tier club, Queens Park Rangers, where he played as a wing half until retiring in 1930 at the age of 37.

He then went back to Scotland and his original trade, as a baker. He died of a heart attack in Kilmarnock in 1941.

Career statistics

References

1892 births
1941 deaths
Footballers from East Ayrshire
Scottish footballers
Association football inside forwards
Association football wing halves
Ardeer Thistle F.C. players
Kilmarnock F.C. players
Galston F.C. players
Brighton & Hove Albion F.C. players
Arsenal F.C. players
Queens Park Rangers F.C. players
Scottish Junior Football Association players
Scottish Football League players
English Football League players